Atif Sheikh (born 18 February 1991) is an English cricketer who played for Derbyshire County Cricket Club. He is a left-arm medium-fast bowler who also bats right-handed. He was born in Nottingham, and made his first-class debut for Derbyshire in the 2010 against Gloucestershire, taking five wickets in the match. Sheikh played for Leicestershire in 2014. In February 2017, Sheikh signed for newly promoted Yorkshire league team, Tickhill Cricket Club.

References

External links
 

Living people
1991 births
English cricketers
Cricketers from Nottingham
British Asian cricketers
Derbyshire cricketers
Leicestershire cricketers
Northamptonshire cricketers
Northumberland cricketers